The 2014–15 Dartmouth Big Green men's basketball team represented Dartmouth College during the 2014–15 NCAA Division I men's basketball season. The Big Green, led by fifth year head coach Paul Cormier, played their home games at Leede Arena and were members of the Ivy League. They finished the season 14–15, 7–7 in Ivy League play to finish in fourth place. They were invited to the CollegeInsider.com Tournament, their first postseason appearance since 1959, where they lost in the first round to Canisius.

Roster

Schedule

|-
!colspan=9 style="background:#00693E; color:#FFFFFF;"| Regular season

|-
!colspan=9 style="background:#00693E; color:#FFFFFF;"| CIT

References

Dartmouth Big Green men's basketball seasons
Dartmouth
Dartmouth
Dart
Dart